Diessenhofen District is a former district of the canton of Thurgau in Switzerland. Its capital was the town of Diessenhofen.

The former district contained the following municipalities:

References

Former districts of Thurgau